Harry Koch (2 September 1930 – 23 April 2012) was a Swiss footballer. He played in nine matches for the Switzerland national football team from 1952 to 1959.

References

External links
 

1930 births
2012 deaths
Swiss men's footballers
Switzerland international footballers
Place of birth missing
Association footballers not categorized by position